Luke Boyd may refer to:

Luke Boyd (born 1987), Australian boxer
Classified (rapper) (born 1977), Canadian rapper born Luke Boyd
Luke James (singer) (born 1984), American singer born Luke James Boyd